The Illinois Central Railroad's No. 1 was the railroad's only 4-6-4 "Hudson" type locomotive and the only 4-6-4 in North America built for freight service.  It was rebuilt in the railroad's own shops from Illinois Central 7000 class 2-8-4 "Berkshire" No. 7038 in 1937 as an experiment to haul fast freight trains, which were growing too large for 4-6-2 "Pacific" types and required more speed than the road's 2-8-2 locomotives could manage; the 2-8-4 class it was rebuilt from had rough riding at above 40 mph.

The experiment was not successful. The locomotive proved prone to slipping, because its factor of adhesion was very low; in simple terms it was too powerful for its ability to grip the rails. The latter was to reduce the starting tractive effort to a level the locomotive's grip on the rails could handle. The improvements were successful, but not to the degree that the railroad ordered any further conversions. The rest of the 2-8-4s would also be rebuilt but retained their wheel arrangements and the last were retired in the mid 1950s.

In 1945, the locomotive was renumbered 2499 and assigned to passenger service between Louisville, Kentucky and Fulton, Kentucky.  It was retired from service in 1949 and soon after scrapped.

References 
 
 

4-6-4 locomotives
1
Lima locomotives
Individual locomotives of the United States
Steam locomotives of the United States
Scrapped locomotives
Freight locomotives
Standard gauge locomotives of the United States
Railway locomotives introduced in 1926